The Wisconsin Rapids White Sox were a Wisconsin State League baseball team based in Wisconsin Rapids, Wisconsin, United States. They were affiliated with the Chicago White Sox and played their home games at Witter Field. They played from 1940 to 1942, and again from 1946 to 1953.

References

Baseball teams established in 1940
Defunct minor league baseball teams
Wood County, Wisconsin
Wisconsin State League teams
Chicago White Sox minor league affiliates
Professional baseball teams in Wisconsin
1940 establishments in Wisconsin
1953 disestablishments in Wisconsin
Sports in Wisconsin Rapids, Wisconsin
Defunct baseball teams in Wisconsin
Baseball teams disestablished in 1953